Captain on the Helm, also known as Captain at the Helm, is an outdoor bronze sculpture by Michael Martino, installed at Chicago's Navy Pier, in the U.S. state of Illinois. The statue was donated by the Chicago Lodge of Shipmasters International and dedicated on May 19, 2000. A plaque reads, "To those courageous mariners who guided their ships through perilous waters, carrying cargo and people. Their contributions have been so much a part of our history. May they never be forgotten."

References

External links
 

2000 establishments in Illinois
2000 sculptures
Bronze sculptures in Illinois
Sculptures of men in Illinois
Statues in Chicago